The Texas African American History Memorial is an outdoor monument commemorating the impact of African Americans in Texas, installed on the Texas State Capitol grounds in Austin, Texas, United States. The memorial was sculpted by Ed Dwight and erected by the Texas African American History Memorial Foundation in 2016. It describes African American history from the 1500s to present, and includes depictions of Hendrick Arnold and Barbara Jordan, as well as Juneteenth (June 19, 1865), when African Americans were emancipated.

See also

 2016 in art

References

External links

2016 establishments in Texas
2016 sculptures
African-American history of Texas
Juneteenth
Monuments and memorials in Texas
Outdoor sculptures in Austin, Texas
Sculptures of African Americans
Sculptures of men in Texas
Sculptures of women in Texas
Statues in Texas
Sculptures by Ed Dwight